Marvin D. Weidner (August 29, 1911 – July 29, 1980) was a former Republican member of the Pennsylvania House of Representatives.

References

1980 deaths
Republican Party members of the Pennsylvania House of Representatives
1911 births
20th-century American politicians